Logo is a Central Sudanic language spoken in the Democratic Republic of the Congo by 210,000 people in 1989 according to SIL.

References

Moru-Madi languages
Languages of the Democratic Republic of the Congo